Torka is a small high-elevation settlement in the Municipality of Železniki in the Upper Carniola region of Slovenia. It no longer has any permanent residents.

Name
Torka was attested in historical sources in 1501 as Am Thorekh. The name is believed to be a compound of German origin, from Middle High German tor 'gate' + egge 'hill, peak', thus meaning 'mountain gate' and referring to access through the village to the Ratitovec Ridge.

References

External links

Torka at Geopedia

Populated places in the Municipality of Železniki